Vaupesia is a plant genus of the family Euphorbiaceae first described as a genus in 1955. It contains only one known species, Vaupesia cataractarum, native to southeastern Colombia and northwestern Brazil.

References

Monotypic Euphorbiaceae genera
Jatropheae
Flora of South America